Angelo Polledri (18 January 1904 – 18 July 1997) was an Italian coxswain.

Polledri was born in Piacenza in 1904. At the 1927 European Rowing Championships, he won gold with the men's eight. The same team competed at the 1928 Summer Olympics in Amsterdam where they were eliminated in the quarter-final. Polledri was the last survivor of the team and died on 18 July 1997.

References

1904 births
1997 deaths
Italian male rowers
Olympic rowers of Italy
Rowers at the 1928 Summer Olympics
Sportspeople from Piacenza
Coxswains (rowing)
European Rowing Championships medalists